Wiehe is a surname. Notable people with the surname include:

Denis Wiehe (born 1940), Mauritian Roman Catholic bishop
Gabrielle Wiehe (born 1980), Mauritian illustrator and graphic designer
Henrik Wiehe (1927–1987), Danish actor
Mikael Wiehe (born 1946), Swedish singer, multi-instrumentalist and composer
Viggo Wiehe (1874-1956), Danish actor